The Fred Krug Brewery was located at 2435 Deer Park Boulevard in Omaha, Nebraska. Founded in 1859, Krug Brewery was the first brewery in the city. Krug was one of the "Big 4" brewers located in Omaha, which also included the Storz, Willow Springs and Metz breweries.  Later sold to Falstaff in 1936, the facility closed in 1987.

History
In 1859 Frederick Krug established the Krug Brewery with an original output of one and a half barrels a day. In 1878 the brewery was located on Farnam between 10th & 11th Streets in Downtown Omaha, and by 1880 it was brewing approximately 25,000 barrels a year. In 1894 the brewery moved to 29th & Vinton Street near South Omaha. It cost $750,000 and was reportedly one of the best equipped breweries in the country. Omaha's historic Anheuser-Busch Beer Depot is the only remaining building from the original Krug Brewery.

Krug brewed beer under several labels: Fred Krug, Cabinet, and Luxus. Krug supported an amateur baseball team called Luxus, taking them as far as the Amateur Baseball World Championship in 1915.

Krug Brewery bought a park in the Benson neighborhood of Omaha in 1904, built a beer garden, added amusement rides, and renamed it "Krug Park". The park was successful until 1930, when a roller coaster accident killed four people; soon after the park folded.

The brewery stopped operating during Prohibition (1920–33), and resumed operations in fall 1933 following its repeal. Three years later, the company was sold to Falstaff Brewing of St. Louis, Missouri, making Falstaff the first major brewer to operate separate plants in different states. The plant ceased operations in 1987, and several buildings were demolished in 1996.

See also
 History of Omaha
 List of defunct consumer brands
 List of defunct breweries in the United States

References

External links
 "Advertising aerial picture"
 Advertisement for Krug's Cabinet label beer.
 "Later advertising picture"
 "Exterior picture"
 "Aerial picture of the brewery"
 "Inside brewery office"
 "The Brew Kettle"
 "Inside the cellars"
 "Inside the bottling plant"

Beer brewing companies based in Omaha, Nebraska
History of South Omaha, Nebraska
Demolished buildings and structures in Omaha, Nebraska
Defunct companies based in Omaha, Nebraska
Defunct consumer brands
Falstaff Brewing Corporation
Defunct brewery companies of the United States
Food and drink companies established in 1859
Food and drink companies disestablished in 1936
German-American culture in Omaha, Nebraska
1859 establishments in Nebraska Territory
1936 mergers and acquisitions
1936 disestablishments in Nebraska
Buildings and structures demolished in 1996